Eglish is a small village in County Tyrone, Northern Ireland. It is about 6 km southwest of Dungannon, in the Mid Ulster District Council area. In the 2001 Census it had a population of 93. The village has grown in a dispersed form and has a mix of housing, industry and services.

Sport
Eglish St. Patrick's is the local Gaelic Athletic Association club.

Schools
Roan St Patrick's is the local primary school.

References

Links

Villages in County Tyrone